The geology of Italy includes mountain ranges such as the Alps and the Apennines formed from the uplift of igneous and primarily marine sedimentary rocks all formed since the Paleozoic. Some active volcanoes are located in Insular Italy.

Geologic history, stratigraphy, and tectonics

Paleozoic (541-251 million years ago)

The oldest rocks in Italy may include oceanic crust subducted during the Caledonian orogeny and 440 million year old Ordovician granites. Only detrital zircons in the Alps dates to the Precambrian.

These granites are located offshore of Venice, found in the Agip Assunta well and deformed, transforming into orthogneiss during the Hercynian orogeny. Overall, Italian Paleozoic rocks commonly show evidence of the Hercynian orogeny in the Alps, Sardinia, the Apuan Alps of Tuscany, and the Peloritani mountains of Sicily and Calabria.

The Hercynian orogeny produced a large thrust belt, thickened the crust and led to polyphaser metamorphism yielding rocks such as gneiss, phyllite and amphibolite. Metamorphic facies range from high-pressure kyanite to low-pressure andalusite.

The Western Alps at Mont Blanc and Monte Rosa, the Southern Alps at Braveno, Brixen, Cima d'Asta, Doss del Sabion and the Barbagia and Gallura granites in Sardinia are all examples of Carboniferous and Permian granite pluton and batholith intrusions. Ignimbrite eruptions had an important role at the same time in forming parts of the central Southern Alps. Sedimentary rocks from before the Permian have remained intact and unmetamorphosed (or only having experienced low-grade metamorphism) in the Paleocarnian charn of the eastern Southern Alps. The metamorphic grade increases to the west, reaching amphibolite grade in the Orobic Alps and granulite grade in the Ivrea-Verbano Zone. Most of the basement rocks in the Dolomites are phyllite or gneiss at greenschist grade. Within the Dioritic-Kinzigitic unit, biotite and sillimanite-rich gneiss outcrop in Calabria.

At the same time in the Permian and Carboniferous, the opening of the west branch of the Tethys Ocean reoriented sections of Italy atop the Adriatic Plate and created the Ligure-Piemontese ocean basin, leading to widespread deposition of carbonates, evaporites and red beds. Units such as the Valgardena Sandstone emplaced during a westward marine transgression in areas later uplifted as the Alps. These sandstones were succeeded by sabkha, the lagoonal Bellerophon Formation, volcanic rocks, the Werfen Formation and Servino Formation.

Mesozoic (251-66 million years ago)
Even in the 19th century, geologists recognized Ladinian and Carnian age carbonate platforms in the Dolomites that likely formed as coral atolls. Throughout the early Triassic, the Zorzino Limestone, Rhaetian Choncodon Dolomite, Riva di Solto Shale and Zu Limestone filled the Lombard Basin. Up to two kilometers of carbonates assembled in the late Triassic as the Dolomia Principale. Meanwhile, the Lagonegro Basin accumulated limestone, chert and marl into the Jurassic. Complex tectonics produced horst and graben features and some lowlands deposited evaporites, such as the Burano Anhydrite—now a significant unit in the Apennine Mountains.

Jurassic tectonic conditions differed somewhat from the Triassic, resulting in new basin formation and a carbonate depositional environment akin to the current day Florida-Bahamas platform. Southern Alps basins such as the Lombard Basin and the Belluno Basin gathered marl and limestone, while turbidite and nodular limestone was more common in the Vajont Limestone, Fonzaso Formation and Selcifero Lombardo. In addition to wide shelf environments like the Bahamas, seamounts like the Trento Swell or the Sicilian Iblean and Saccense zones, some basins such as the Piemontese Basin, the Lagonegro Basin and the Ligurian-western Tuscan Ligure Basin were situated above ophiolite and ended up with abundant radiolarite fossils in limestone.

During the Cretaceous, global high sea levels and local tectonic conditions produced a greater share of basins than platform environments (although the Campano-Lucana, Friuli, Apulia and Latium-Abruzzi platforms persisted). More pelagic, open water sediments like marl joined breccia and underwater debris flows. Triassic conditions persisted in only one location in Sardinia where up to one kilometer of carbonates finished depositing in the Cretaceous, atop deformed Cambrian-Carboniferous metamorphic basement rock.

Changing interaction between the European Plate and the Adriatic Plate resulted in tectonic compression along the Adriatic Plate's northern margin, kicking off the formation of the Alps and the Apennines. In the late Cretaceous, foredeeps filled with flysch and molasse sediments shed off the rising mountains. Examples include the Bergamo Flysch within the Lombard Basin of the Southern Alps. 

The Mesozoic was largely quiescent in terms of magmatism, but some igneous activity did take place. Pietra Verde sandstones from the Ladinian in the Southern Alps contain calc-alkaline rock while granite, shoshonite and monzonite intruded the Dolomites region into the Carnian. In fact, subsurface rocks in the Po Valley, the Lagonegro Basin, west Trentino, the Venetian foothills, Sicily, Lombary and the northern Apennines show signs of volcaniclastic sediments and pillow lava from the time period.

Although the oceanic crust of the Tethys Ocean has been recycled into the mantle, sections of it remain as ophiolite with peridotite, gabbro, prasinite, serpentinite and pillow lava of Jurassic to Cretaceous age in Liguria, Tuscany, Val d'Aosta and Piemonte. Petrological research indicates that ophiolites in the Alps are metamorphosed, while those in the Apennines are not. The Ragusa Basin in the Iblean Plateau of Sicily had magmatism in the Jurassic, together with the Trapanese Basin, followed by Cretaceous activity in the Syracuse area.

Cenozoic (66 million years ago-present)
  

Around 60 million years ago in the Paleocene, alkali basalt dikes penetrated areas in the Dolomites. Basalt and volcaniclastic rocks also erupted in the Lessini Mountains, together with syenite and trachyte latholiths.

In the Eocene, the Apennine Mountains continued forming. The foothills in Friuli and the Venice-area are remnants of Eocene age flysch shed off the Dinaric Alps. Throughout the Paleogene, the same region witnessed both shale and carbonate formation in shallow water areas away from the Dinarides thrust belt. Paleontologists have gathered extensive fish fossils from the period out of the Bolca quarry close to Verona.

Alpine uplift spurred tonalite, granodiorite, syenite and monzonite emplacement as batholiths and plutons, lasting into the Oligocene, as well as basaltic andesite intrusions. The Insubric Lineament sheared the Bregaglia batholith.

Throughout the Oligocene, a subduction zone—dipping to the west—formed to the east of Sardinia, Corsica and the Alpine belt. Ionian Basin and Adriatic Plate sediments accreted onto the Apennine area as the region migrated to the northeast, spread eastward and to the south. Tectonic evolution of the Southern Alps shifted the foredeep further south, accumulating the Gonfolite Lombarda as well as the Molassa Bellunese in the Miocene. The Gessosso-Solfifera Formation contains evaporites surrounding the Apennines left by the Messinian salinity crisis.
The Bracco Nappe is part of the primarily oceanic rocks of the Ligurian Basin on the western edge of the Apennines. To the east of the Ligurian Basin is the Umbro-Marigiano Basin, which contains the Tuscan Zone—a carbonate platform sequence ending in the Liassic with younger pelagic sediments. The Latium-Abruzzi Platform is to the southeast.

During the Neogene, Apennine foredeeps, such as Central Apeninnic Foredeep migrated to the east into Pleistocene times with continued flysch deposition. Basins that emerged at the period include the Cervarola, Camerino, Laga, Cellino, Macigno and Marnoso-Arenacea.

The Cretaceous to Miocene aged Cilento Flysch, Flysch Rosso and Frido Flysch contain shale, sandstone and conglomerate and are associated with ophiolite, offering evidence of the deformational history during that time span in the southern Apennines. The Numidian Flysch contains quartz and arenite sands likely deposited by a river delta from Africa and overlain by the coarser Goroglione Flysch. Both date to the Miocene.

Uplift continues today and since the Pleistocene, Calabrian sedimentary rocks have uplifted more than one kilometer.

Prior to current volcanism in southern Italy, seamount volcanoes were active in the Tyrrhenian Sea during the Pliocene and Pleistocene, as well as on-land volcanism in Tuscany and Campania (following the course of an Apennine graben). The islands of Elba, Gavorrono, Stromboli and others formed due to eruptions atop oceanic crust from nine million to 180,000 years ago. One offshore eruption in 1891 generated the short-lived island of Ferdinandea which quickly eroded below the water, remaining as the Graham Bank. Mount Etna tends toward less explosive basaltic eruptions.

Natural resource geology

Petroleum exploration in Italy began in the late 19th century and resulted in the discovery of the Caviaga gas field close to Milan in 1944. Apennine folding has created structural traps in Pliocene sand reservoirs in the Bradanic Trough, Adriatic Sea and beneath the Po Plain. In between Brescia and Milan, the stratigraphic traps are formed at the base of Pliocene transgressive rocks and then migrated into Neogene clastic rocks that were experiencing more intense tectonic activity. In some places, organic matter in Miocene flysch may have been the original source of hydrocarbon. Off of eastern Calabria (Crotone), offshore of Trapani in western Sicily and in Gagliano, northeast Sicily are flysch-derived gas condensate reservoirs.

Liassic and Triassic age carbonates and reservoirs offshore in the south Adriatic or onshore at Irpinia are hosted in Triassic dolomites. Extremely deep production more than five kilometers deep takes place east of Milan in the Malossa Field. The eastern Sicilian Gela and Ragusa oil fields are also particularly deep.

In spite of extensive extraction after World War II, Italy still retains oil and gas resources. Production rose from 13.8 million cubic meters of gas in 1984 and 2.2 million tons of oil to 17.4 billion cubic meters and 4.3 million tons of oil by 1991, and new reserves were sound in Italy between 1992 and 1993.

Italy has extensive lignite coal from the Eocene, concentrated in Sardinia. However, extraction is limited by thin seams and complicated tectonics. Graphite anthracite is known in Carboniferous Val d'Aosta rocks and the Permian rocks of Sardinia. Both Calabria and central Italy have peat deposits from the Paleogene.

Because of the extent of mining throughout Italy's history, from Roman times to the present, many of the country's generally small mineral deposits have already been depleted. The country has small deposits of lead, sulfur, copper, zinc, silver, fluorite, barite, strontium, aluminum, gold, beryl, molybdenum, tin, uranium, iron, cobalt, chromium, titanium, mercury and astatine. Quartz, salt, feldspar, asbestos, talc, magnesite, graphite, leucite, bentonite and perlite are all extracted for industrial purposes. Historically, Italy had silver-zinc-lead mines in Monte Neve, Raibl (in the Eastern Alps), and Sardinia, mercury in north Amiata, Tuscany, fluorite and antimony in Sardinia and pyrite in Tuscany. Elba, Cogne in the Val d'Aosta valley and the Nurra Province of Sardinia all had historical iron mining. Sardinia also produced bauxite, the Western Alps asbestos and talc, Liguria and Sardinia manganese, nickel in Piemonte and copper in Val d'Aosta.

Sicily remains active as a producer of sulfur and potassium salts and aluminum production has shifted into leucitic lavas in the center of the country.

See also
Monte Bolca
Volcanism of Italy

References

External links